Melicytus crassifolius (thick-leaved mahoe; syn. Hymenanthera crassifolia Hook.f.) is an ornamental plant of Violaceae family, which is native to New Zealand.

Notes

References

External links
Hymenanthera crassifolia
Hymenanthera crassifolia

crassifolius
Flora of New Zealand